"The Dream" is a poem by the metaphysical poet John Donne. It was first printed in 1633, two years after Donne's death.

References

External links 

 
 

1633 poems
Poetry by John Donne
Poems published posthumously